Siling haba ("long chili"), espada ("sword" in Spanish), siling mahaba, siling pangsigang ("chili for sinigang"), siling Tagalog ("Tagalog chili"), and sometimes called green chili, finger chili or long pepper, is one of two kinds of chili common to the Philippines and Filipino cuisine, the other being siling labuyo. Unlike siling labuyo, it belongs to the species Capsicum annuum.

While of moderate spiciness, it is much milder and less hot than siling labuyo.
It is an ingredient commonly used in Philippine cuisine, spicing up dishes like sinigang, dinuguan, pinangat, kilawin, paksiw, and sisig.

References

Spices
Chili peppers